Daniel Leca, born in September 1985, is a French politician, 4th Vice President of the Regional Council of Hauts-de-France in charge of Higher Education, Research, Innovation and Europe, President of the UDI group in the Hauts-de-France Region, City Councillor of Compiègne (Oise), Community Councillor of the Agglomeration of Compiègne and Vice President of the UDI political party

Biography 
Born in September 1985, Daniel LECA, after having spent all his primary and secondary school in Corsica, graduated from the University of Paris 1 Panthéon-Sorbonne with a Master's degree in History, a Master's degree in Political Science "Administration of Politics", and a second Master's degree in Political and Social Communication. 

He began his professional career as a parliamentary assistant to a deputy of the Haute-Corse. Three years later, in 2011, he was entrusted with the communication of the association "O comme Oxygène", campaign structure of Jean-Louis BORLOO for the presidential election of 2012, then he was in charge of studies and training within the Radical Party, also editor for the Union of General Councillors of France (UCGF). 

At the end of 2012, he decided to join the private sector and became a consultant in a communication consulting firm, where he is now Associate Director. 

In parallel to his professional career, Daniel LECA is involved in politics.He chose to join the Radical Party chaired by Jean-Louis BORLOO at the end of his studies and became the president of the youth movement for 5 years. He relaunched the "under 30 branch", modernized it, reorganized its organization into territories, joined the French Youth Forum, worked on a hundred proposals for the 2012 presidential election and participated in the creation of the Union of Democrats and Independents (UDI). 

In 2015, at the age of 30, he became Secretary General of the Radical Party and Spokesperson of the UDI. That same year, he was elected Regional Councillor for the Hauts-de-France region on the Union of the Right and the Center list led by Xavier BERTRAND. 

A few months later, Valérie LÉTARD, then First Vice President of the region and Senator of the North, entrusted him with the delegated presidency of the UDI-Union Centriste group, the second largest group in the regional majority (41 elected members). 

Sitting on the "Au Travail" commission - which covers formation, relations with companies, economic development, apprenticeship, digital and social innovation - he is concretely committed to the daily economic development of the territories that make up the Hauts-de-France. 

Then, in 2020, having become Vice President of the UDI, Daniel LECA was the head of the list for the municipal elections in Compiègne, the second largest city in the Oise region (40,200 inhabitants). He leads a plural and citizen list, wishing to define a new horizon for the town in front of the outgoing mayor seeking a 7th mandate. Having obtained a score of nearly 32% in the first round despite a very heavy health context, he succeeded in getting 7 municipal councilors and 4 community councilors elected. 

That same year, in 2020, Xavier BERTRAND entrusted him with the Vice-Presidency in charge of Higher Education, Research, Europe and the State-Region plan contract. 

In June 2021, again candidate for regional elections in Hauts-de-France on the scope by Xavier BERTRAND - this time leader of the UDI -, Daniel LECA is re-elected and becomes 4th Vice President in charge of Higher Education, Research, Innovation and Europe, as well as president of his UDI group (29 elected).

References

Living people
1984 births
University of Paris alumni
Union of Democrats and Independents politicians